A Physical Security Professional (PSP) is a Board certification process for individuals involved in the physical security of organizations. This certification process is offered by ASIS International.  Certification lasts for three years, during which time ASIS requires credential holders to complete 60 Continuing Professional Education credits in order to meet recertification standards.

Purpose of certification
The intent of this certification is to provide employers a means of knowing that an individual has a high level of knowledge pertaining to physical security.  ASIS set the bar high, starting with specific eligibility requirements and continuing with recertification standards.  They test applicants for knowledge and expertise in a number of areas such as threat assessment and risk analysis, an understanding of integrated physical security systems, and the ability to implement, evaluate and identify security measures and/or needs for a wide variety of protection situations.  All of this is to maintain an accurate reflection of current industry skill and knowledge needs as well as to keep abreast of new technology and best practices.

Skill requirements
Technical experience and skills involved in this certification include:
 Performing threat surveys to evaluate the dangers present at a location or in an organization.
 Design of security procedures and systems.
 Responsibilities of people associated with security and response procedures.
 Setup, operation, and maintenance of security systems.

Eligibility requirements
ASIS lists the minimum requirements to take the PSP credential certification as follows:

 High school diploma, GED equivalent, or associate degree.
 Six years of progressive experience in the physical security field.
 The applicant must not have been convicted of any criminal offense that would reflect negatively on the security profession, ASIS, or the certification program.
OR
 Bachelor's degree or higher.
 Four years of progressive experience in the physical security field.
 The applicant must not have been convicted of any criminal offense that would reflect negatively on the security profession, ASIS, or the certification program.

Areas of expertise
Areas of certification by PSP include:
Executive protection
Home security
Security systems

See also
 Physical Security
 Security
 Guard tour patrol system
 Boundaries of Security Report

References

External links
Physical Security Professional Webpage
Security Guard Company

Professional titles and certifications
Protective service occupations
Physical security